In topology, a topological space is said to be resolvable if it is expressible as the union of two disjoint dense subsets. For instance, the real numbers form a resolvable topological space because the rationals and  irrationals are disjoint dense subsets. A topological space that is not resolvable is termed irresolvable.

Properties 
 The product of two resolvable spaces is resolvable
 Every locally compact topological space without isolated points is resolvable
 Every submaximal space is irresolvable

See also
 Glossary of topology

References
 
 
 

Properties of topological spaces